Beswick is a village and civil parish in the East Riding of Yorkshire, England.

The civil parish is formed by the villages of Beswick and Kilnwick and the hamlet of Wilfholme.
According to the 2011 UK census, Beswick parish had a population of 357, a slight decline on the 2001 UK census figure of 372.

Beswick was the former home of P.H. Sissons & Sons, famous for wheelwrighting and building 'Wolds Wagons' since 1854. One of the wagons is at Skidby Windmill.

Beswick Hall was designated a Grade II* listed building in 1968 and is now recorded in the National Heritage List for England, maintained by Historic England.

References

External links

Villages in the East Riding of Yorkshire
Civil parishes in the East Riding of Yorkshire